Jordan Riak (January 11, 1935 – April 2016) was a teacher and activist against corporal punishment  who drafted the 1986 bill which banned corporal punishment from public schools in California.

Early life
Riak was born January 11, 1935, in, Dover, New Jersey. He was a native of nearby Morristown.

Family
Riak was married to Anne Riak. Riak had three children, Oren Riak, Justin Riak, and Veketa.

Career and activism
Riak began working against corporal punishment when he was residing with his children in Sydney, Australia and he was appalled to find out that corporal punishment was practiced in the Australian school system. Riak began working against corporal punishment when he was residing with his children in Sydney, Australia and he was appalled to find out that corporal punishment was practiced in the Australian school system.[3]

Moving to California, he incorporated PTAVE there, and with Assemblymen Sam Farr, successfully introduced legislation to end corporal punishment in schools in California in 1987, making it the ninth state to do so.

Riak's ultimate goal was to turn the United States into a spanking-free nation.

Riak worked with David and Blythe Daniel, psychology professors who teach at Los Angeles City College. The Daniels, who advocate children's rights through the We the Children Foundation and through education and workshops, campaigned with Riak for an anti-spanking resolution by the Los Angeles City Council, because "Spanking communicates to everyone that children have no rights, that they don't get the respect that other human beings get, and it's horrible," David Daniel said.

Riak believed that neither the responsible parenting of children or the responsible teaching of children should involve violence.

Riak was the executive director of Parents and Teachers Against Violence in Education from 1992 until his death in 2016.

Death
Riak died in April 2016 at the age of 81 in Alamo, California.

Other attributions
The character William Jordan Walcott in Blake Hutchison's 2016 novel Nobody's Property is named partially in honor of Riak. It is additionally inferred in the novel that the woman Will calls "mom" is ardently opposed to corporal punishment and was photographed with Riak at one point in the 1990s.

His birthday (January 11) is currently designated as a religious holiday by the Church of Human Dignity.

References

1935 births
2016 deaths
Children's rights activists
American activists
People from Dover, New Jersey
People from Morristown, New Jersey